Attila Kerekes (born 4 April 1954) is a Hungarian former footballer who played at both professional and international levels as a defender.

Career
Born in Budapest, Kerekes played club football in both Hungary and Turkey for Békéscsaba and Bursaspor.

He also earned 15 caps for the Hungarian national team between 1976 and 1984, representing them at the 1982 FIFA World Cup.

References

1954 births
Living people
Hungarian footballers
Hungarian expatriate footballers
Hungary international footballers
1982 FIFA World Cup players
Footballers from Budapest
Békéscsaba 1912 Előre footballers
Bursaspor footballers
Expatriate footballers in Turkey
Hungarian expatriate sportspeople in Turkey
Association football defenders